"Shine" is the lead single released from Greyscale, the eight studio album by German synthpop band Camouflage. The record was released on February 20, 2015 via Bureau B label. The composition features strings and orchestra parts performed by Deutsches Filmorchester Babelsberg.

Track listing

Credits
Artwork – Christian Küpker
Mastering – Tom Meyer
Photography – Klaus Mellenthin
Producer – Heiko Maile, Jochen Schmalbach, Volker Hinkel
Written by – Heiko Maile, Jochen Schmalbach, Marcus Meyn, Oliver Kreyssig, Volker Hinkel

References

External links
 Official website
 

2015 singles
Camouflage (band) songs
2014 songs
Songs written by Heiko Maile